I Love Melvin is a 1953 American Technicolor musical romantic comedy film directed by Don Weis, starring Donald O'Connor and Debbie Reynolds. According to MGM records, the film earned $1,316,000 in the United States and Canada and $654,000 overseas, resulting in a loss of $290,000.

Plot
Small-time actress Judy Schneider dreams of becoming a Hollywood star even as she struggles along playing a human football in a kitschy Broadway musical. One day in Central Park she bumps into Melvin, the bumbling assistant to a Look magazine photographer. Melvin is smitten with Judy and endures disapproval from her father who wants her to marry Harry Flack, the boring heir to a paper box company. He exaggerates his importance at the magazine in order to impress Judy and her family and promises to get her on the cover, using the photo shoots as an excuse to spend time with her. His charade is exposed when her picture doesn't appear on the cover and she discovers that he is just a lowly assistant. Too ashamed to face her, Melvin abandons his job and disappears into Central Park. While hiding in the Park he sees Judy's picture on the cover of Look and discovers that the editor made her a cover girl so he would see it and come out of hiding.

Cast
 Donald O'Connor as Melvin Hoover
 Debbie Reynolds as Judy Schneider  Judy LeRoy
 Una Merkel as Mom Schneider
 Richard Anderson as Harry Flack
 Allyn Joslyn as Frank Schneider
 Les Tremayne as Mr. Henneman
 Noreen Corcoran as Clarabelle Schneider
 Jim Backus as Mergo
 Barbara Ruick as Studio Guide
 Robert Taylor as himself (cameo appearance in Judy's dream)

Music
Lyrics by Mack Gordon, and music by Josef Myrow 
"Lady Loves" (Debbie Reynolds)
"We Have Never Met as Yet" (Debbie Reynolds and Donald O'Connor)
"Saturday Afternoon Before the Game" (Chorus)
"Where Did You Learn to Dance" (Debbie Reynolds and Donald O'Connor)
"I Wanna Wander" (Donald O'Connor)
"Life Has Its Funny Ups and Downs" (Noreen Corcoran)

Comic book adaptation
 Eastern Color Movie Love #20 (April 1953)

Notes

References

External links

 
 
 
 

1953 films
1953 musical comedy films
1953 romantic comedy films
1950s English-language films
1950s romantic musical films
American musical comedy films
American romantic comedy films
American romantic musical films
Films about photojournalists
Films adapted into comics
Films directed by Don Weis
Films set in New York City
Films with screenplays by George Wells
Metro-Goldwyn-Mayer films
1950s American films